Patrick Francis Labyorteaux (born July 22, 1965) is an American actor, television producer and television writer. In many of his earlier credits, his last name is spelled as "Laborteaux". He is best known for his roles of Andrew "Andy" Garvey on the NBC series Little House on the Prairie as well as Bud Roberts on the CBS series JAG and NCIS.

Early life 
Labyorteaux was born on July 22, 1965, in Los Angeles, California to unknown biological parents. He was adopted by Ronald "Ron" Labyorteaux (1930–1992), a talent agent, and Frances Mae "Frankie" Labyorteaux (1927–2012), an actress who used the stage name Frances Marshall, at the age of nine months. Little is known of his personal life before he was adopted, though his adoptive mother commented that when they first met Labyorteaux, he was suffering from malnutrition and had been labeled "unadoptable" by social workers. His brother, Matthew Labyorteaux, was adopted by Ronald and Frances in 1967, when he was 10 months old, and his sister, Jane Labyorteaux, at an unknown date.

Life and career
Labyorteaux, also credited as Patrick Laborteaux in his early career, starred on television and in film. His well-known TV roles are on the hit NBC series Little House on the Prairie as Andrew "Andy" Garvey from 1977–1981, and on the CBS hit series JAG as Lt. Cmdr. Bud Roberts from 1995 to 2005, a role he reprised in three episodes of JAG's spin-off, NCIS. Other TV shows on which he has made guest appearances include Starsky & Hutch, 21 Jump Street, Living Single, Yes, Dear, Lois & Clark: The New Adventures of Superman, The Love Boat, Ghost Whisperer, and iCarly.

He starred in films as well. He played Patrick, great-nephew of Lucille Ball's character in the 1974 film Mame. One of his well-known roles is in the 1987 comedy film Summer School as football player Kevin Winchester alongside future JAG/NCIS costar Mark Harmon. He appeared in the 1988 cult film Heathers as Ram Sweeney. He voices cartoons such as Spider-Man: The Animated Series, Godzilla: The Series and others.

Personal life
Labyorteaux has been married to Tina Albanese, a TV producer, since 1998. Together, they have one child, a son named Jeau Bennett Labyorteaux (b. 2001).

Filmography

Film

Television

References

External links

1965 births
Male actors from Los Angeles
American adoptees
American male child actors
American male film actors
American male television actors
Television producers from California
American television writers
American male television writers
American male voice actors
20th-century American male actors
21st-century American male actors
Living people
Screenwriters from California